Manny Pacquiao vs. Joshua Clottey, billed as The Event, was a welterweight fight for the WBO welterweight championship. The bout was held on March 13, 2010, at Cowboys Stadium, in Arlington, Texas, United States. This match was put together after the long awaited "superfight" between Manny Pacquiao and Floyd Mayweather Jr. had fallen through.

Negotiations
Following Pacquiao's victory against Cotto, there was much public demand for a fight between the two best pound-for-pound fighters in the world: Pacquiao and Floyd Mayweather Jr. Pacquiao reportedly agreed to fight Mayweather on March 13, 2010, for a split of 50 million dollars up front. And it was later agreed that the venue for the fight would be the MGM Grand Las Vegas. However, the bout was put in jeopardy due to disagreements about Olympic-style drug testing. The Mayweather camp wanted random blood testing by the United States Anti-Doping Agency, whereas Pacquiao refused to have any blood testing within 30 days from the fight, because he thought it would weaken him, but he was willing to have blood taken from him before the 30-day window as well as immediately after the fight. Freddie Roach, on the other hand, commented that he would allow blood to be taken from Pacquiao one week before the fight. In an attempt to resolve their differences, the two camps went through a process of mediation before a retired judge. After the mediation process, Mayweather claimed that he agreed to a 14-day no blood testing window, however, Pacquiao refused and instead only agreed to a 24-day no blood testing window. Consequently, on January 7, 2010, Pacquiao's promoter Bob Arum declared that the fight was officially off.

Pacquiao agreed to random blood testing above and beyond that which is required by the rules of the Nevada State Athletic Commission, but not to the extent requested by Mayweather.  Despite producing no evidence to back their claims (Pacquiao has been drug tested for all of his past fights in Las Vegas and has passed them all), the Mayweather camp had repeatedly suggested Pacquiao was using banned substances throughout the negotiations, which resulted in Pacquiao filing a lawsuit for defamation, seeking damages in excess of 75,000 dollars. The lawsuit cited accusations made by Mayweather, Floyd Mayweather Sr., Roger Mayweather, Oscar De La Hoya, and Golden Boy Promotions CEO Richard Schaefer. The lawsuit claimed that the damaging and unfounded accusations were made out of "ill-will, spite, malice, revenge, and envy." Pacquiao stated: "I maintain and assure everyone that I have not used any form or kind of steroids and that my way to the top is a result of hard work, hard work, hard work and a lot of blood spilled from my past battles in the ring, not outside of it."

After negotiations for the Mayweather fight fell through, other boxers were considered to replace Mayweather as the next opponent for Pacquiao, including former light welterweight champion Paul Malignaggi and current WBA super welterweight champion Yuri Foreman, while Mayweather considered Malignaggi and the smaller Nate Campbell as potential opponents for his next fight.  However, Pacquiao chose to fight Joshua Clottey instead, a tough boxer from Ghana and the former IBF welterweight champion.

The fight
Pacquiao won every round and ultimately the fight through a unanimous decision. He dominated the punch count throughout the fight. Clottey landed some successful punches in the middle rounds, but never produced a sustained offensive. Manny Pacquiao defended his title by unanimous decision, 120-108, 119-109, 119-109. After the fight, Pacquiao returned to Manila. At the time, he reflected on a possible retirement.

The fight was rewarded with a paid crowd of 36,371 and a gate of $6,359,985, according to post-fight tax reports filed with Texas boxing regulators.  Counting complimentary tickets delivered to sponsors, media outlets and others, the Dallas fight attracted 41,843, well short of the 50,994 that was previously announced, but still an epic number for boxing. In addition, the bout drew 700,000 pay-per-view buys and earned $35.3 million in domestic revenue.

Undercard

References

External links
Top Rank Boxing

Clottey
2010 in boxing
Boxing in Texas
Sports in Arlington, Texas
21st century in Arlington, Texas
2010 in sports in Texas
March 2010 sports events in the United States
Boxing on HBO
Events in Arlington, Texas